IKCO Arisun and IKCO Arisun 2 are small coupe utilitys (pickups) designed by Iran Khodro, based on the Peugeot 405. Production started in 2015, and it costs about $7,000. Production was temporarily halted in December 2016, but has since recommenced.

Arisun 1 shares the same chassis and engine as Paykan, although it's bodyshell is from the Peugeot 405, with some slight modifications. This model was discontinued due to Euro 5 emission standards.

The replacement, Arisun 2, is released in 2022. This model is more closely based on Peugeot 405, ditching the Paykan 1.7 litre bi-fuel (CNG and gasoline) engine for XU7 Plus engine (seen on Peugeot Pars) with Euro 5 standard. This model is also front wheel drive, unlike the Arisun 1 that is rear wheel drive. Unusually, load capacity has been increased from 600 kg to 750 kg.

References 

Arisun
Iranian brands
Cars introduced in 2015